Black Mountain Poets is a 2015 British comedy film directed by Jamie Adams and starring Alice Lowe, Dolly Wells and Tom Cullen. Largely improvised from Adams’ plot outline, the film won the Student Critics’ Jury Award at the Edinburgh International Film Festival.

Synopsis
Two sisters on-the-run for petty crimes hide out at a poetry retreat in the Black Mountains, Wales impersonating the world renowned poets whose car they stole.

Cast
Alice Lowe as Lisa Walker
Dolly Wells as Clare Walker
Tom Cullen as Richard 
Rosa Robson as Louise Cabaye
Richard Elis as Gareth
Laura Patch as Stacey
Hannah Daniel as Alys Wilding
Claire Cage as Terri Wilding

Production
The film marked the third in a trilogy of films by Newport Film School graduate Jamie Adams about modern love, after 2014’s Benny & Jolene and A Wonderful Christmas Time. The film was shot in five days on location in the Welsh Black Mountains.

Release
The film had its world premiere at the Edinburgh International Film Festival in 2015. The film had a limited UK cinema release in April 2016.

Reception
Peter Bradshaw in The Guardian said the film was “flimsy, funny…very silly and likeable” noting that “there are some big laughs, particularly from Alice Lowe” but with little “narrative plausibility”. Guy Lodge in Variety said “Alice Lowe and Dolly Wells are a riot” and described a “deftly escalated farce as humane as it is hilarious”.  Neil Young in the Hollywood Reporter saw a “slight but likeable…uneven, shoestring-budgeted charmer” and praises cinematographer Ryan Owen Eddleston‘s demonstrations of the “alluringly elemental Welsh countryside” and praises the performances of Lowe and Wells but feels the film underuses Hannah Daniel and Clare Cage who “are consistently hilarious in their fleeting, intermittent appearances as the bemused, bohemian-bard [Wilding] babes. David Jenkins in Little White Lies (magazine) praises Lowe saying “watching this film is a simple case of waiting for Alice Lowe to appear on screen. If everyone in the cast gives a solid seven out of 10, she’s easily a 12. The camera naturally gravitates towards her, wise to the fact that her reaction to a line of dialogue will likely be funnier than the dialogue itself. She’s hilarious, casually outclassing her fellow players. Even the way she wears a hat is amusing.” Jenkins felt though that the film begins to run out of steam after 30 minutes and the laughs dry up as it transitions from crime caper plot to romance, saying “in its blind search for profundity, it’s a film which loses sight of what makes it interesting in the first place.”

References

External links

2010s English-language films
Films shot in Wales
British romantic drama films
Films directed by Jamie Adams